The 2013 National Club Baseball Association (NCBA) Division II World Series was played at Brooks Stadium in Paducah, KY from May 17 to May 21. The sixth tournament's champion was Kennesaw State University. The Most Valuable Player was Aaron Moore of Kennesaw State University.

Format
The format is similar to the NCAA College World Series in that eight teams participate in two four-team double elimination brackets. There are a few differences between the NCAA and the NCBA format. One of which is that the losers of Games 1–4 move to the other half of the bracket. Another difference is that the NCBA plays a winner take all for its national title game while the NCAA has a best-of-3 format to determine its national champion.  Another difference which is between NCBA Division I and II is that Division II games are 7 innings while Division I games are 9 innings.

Participants
‡ - denotes school also has a NCBA Division I team

Results

Bracket

Game results

Championship game

See also
2013 NCBA Division II Tournament
2013 NCBA Division I World Series
2013 NCBA Division I Tournament

Notes
 Kennesaw State, Northeastern, SIU Edwardsville and Wyoming all moved up to the NCBA Division I following the World Series for the 2013–14 season.

References

Baseball in Kentucky
2013 in baseball
National Club Baseball Association